The Kimza Government was the first organized government to formally declare the Independence of Albania from the Ottoman Empire.

Background
For the first time since the death of Albanian national hero Skanderbeg, an organized gathering of representatives from the northern bajraks took part in the establishment of a unified government. They hailed from the following settlements: Spaç, Fan, Gojan, Orosh, Kushnen, Kthellë, Shkodër, Dibërr, Mërtur, Berish, Shalë, Shosh, Thaç, Toplanë, Theth and Nikaj.

The head of the Kimza government, Arbëresh lawyer and activist Terenc Toçi, sought to stage a "revolution" uprising from north to south to "have a single spirit, a flag, simultaneity of action and discipline and to persuade the civilized world to intervene in  our interests". Toçi selected the indigenous Mirditë region in order to form a national nucleus ”that would also serve as a spark for a pan-Albanian movement.

Fan Assembly
The cross-regional assembly held in Fan, Mirditë on April 26, 1911, created the first government for the independence of the nation:

Government

Aftermath
The Provisional Government of Kimza paved the way for the declaration of independence in Vlorë on December 28, 1912. Its leader, Terenc Toçi was subsequently shot and killed on April 14, 1945 by a decision of the special court of the communist regime for being a fascist collaborator. His remains were found on a hill in the outskirts of Tirana.

References